I Keep Coming Back may refer to:

 "I Keep Coming Back" (Razzy Bailey song), a 1980 song by Razzy Bailey
 "I Keep Coming Back" (Josh Gracin song), a 2007 song by Josh Gracin
 "I Keep Coming Back", a song on the 1993 album Gentlemen by the Afghan Whigs
 I Keep Comin' Back!, a 1966 album by saxophonist Sonny Stitt

See also
 Keep Coming Back (disambiguation)